Chima Ephraim Okorie (born 8 October 1968 in Izomber, Abia State) is a Nigerian former professional football striker who was renowned for his goalscoring prowess in the Indian leagues. He went on to score 131 goals for East Bengal in three seasons, becoming the top scorer in the history of East Bengal crossing K. P. Dhanaraj who had 127 goals, until it was crossed by Bhaichung Bhutia.

Playing career
Okorie moved to India as a student, his big break came when he played first time in the Durand Cup, when he represented Visakhapatnam and Hyderabad XI. There was no such thing as Chandigarh team was an all volunteer team and could not afford to pay their players. He then signed a major deal with Mohammedan SC, East Bengal and Mohun Bagan. With Mohammedan, he scored sixteen goals in 1985 CFL season. He captained East Bengal in 1990–91. He was a deadly forward and use to score by using his tremendous power, He is also the first foreign player in Mohun Bagan. He then moved to England, joining Peterborough United on non-contract terms before joining Grimsby Town in September 1993.

He made his English league debut as a substitute away to Crystal Palace winning the Sunday Man of the match, and made four further appearances (all as a substitute) as his career at Grimsby was interrupted by a broken leg. He moved to Torquay United in March 1994 and was a regular in the Torquay side for the next twelve months, before losing his place to Duane Darby.

He was released at the end of the 1994–95 season was joined Norwegian second-tier side Sogndal, later playing for Danish premier sides Ikast FS and Viborg FF. He returned to India to play again for Mohun Bagan, but received a two-year suspension after being accused of assaulting a referee in a game on 31 August 1999.

In 2001, he came back to India and signed with Bengal Mumbai FC. He appeared in few matches of Mumbai Senior Division with BMFC.

Managerial career
On 3 June 2006, he was made manager of Bengal-Mumbai FC, and also became the club's CEO on 16 August. He was appointed manager of Mohun Bagan on 20 February 2007, but resigned on 7 April following differences with the club's senior players. He then became the manager of the Delhi based I-League 2nd division side Osian's New Delhi Heroes.

Honours

Individual
Calcutta Football League Top Scorer: 1987 (26 goals), 1991 (11 goals)

See also
List of foreign players for SC East Bengal

References

Further reading

External links
Profile at UpThePosh! The Peterborough United Database

1968 births
Living people
Association football forwards
Nigerian footballers
Peterborough United F.C. players
Grimsby Town F.C. players
Torquay United F.C. players
Ikast FS players
East Bengal Club players
Viborg FF players
Sogndal Fotball players
Norwegian First Division players
Danish Superliga players
Nigerian expatriate footballers
Expatriate footballers in Bangladesh
Expatriate footballers in India
Expatriate footballers in England
Expatriate men's footballers in Denmark
Expatriate footballers in Norway
Nigerian expatriate sportspeople in Bangladesh
Nigerian expatriate sportspeople in India
Nigerian expatriate sportspeople in England
Nigerian expatriate sportspeople in Denmark
Nigerian expatriate sportspeople in Norway
Mohun Bagan AC players
Mohammedan SC (Kolkata) players
Bengal Mumbai FC players
Calcutta Football League players
Nigerian football managers
Mohun Bagan AC managers
Sportspeople from Imo State